In chemistry, the  intimate ion pair concept, introduced by Saul Winstein, describes the interactions between a cation, anion and surrounding solvent molecules. In ordinary aqueous solutions of inorganic salts, an ion is completely solvated and shielded from the counterion. In less polar solvents, two ions can still be connected to some extent. In a tight, intimate, or contact ion pair, there are no solvent molecules between the two ions. When solvation increases, ionic bonding decreases and a loose or solvent-shared ion pair results. The ion pair concept explains stereochemistry in solvolysis.

The concept of intimate ion pairs is used to explain the slight tendency for inversion of stereochemistry during an S1 reaction. It is proposed that solvent or other ions in solution may assist in the removal of a leaving group to form a carbocation which reacts in an S1 fashion; similarly, the leaving group may associate loosely with the cationic intermediate. The association of solvent or an ion with the leaving group effectively blocks one side of the incipient carbocation, while allowing the backside to be attacked by a nucleophile. This leads to a slight excess of the product with inverted stereochemistry, whereas a purely S1 reaction should lead to a racemic product. Intimate ion pairs are also invoked in the Si mechanism. Here, part of the leaving group detaches and attacks from the same face, leading to retention.

See also 
Ion association
Asymmetric ion-pairing catalysis

References 

Chemical bonding

it:Coppia ionica